Eupeodes bucculatus is a Palearctic hoverfly.

Description
External images Eupeodes bucculatus is very similar to Eupeodes luniger, Eupeodes latifasciatus, and Eupeodes nielseni and difficult to identify   The adult insect
is illustrated in colour by Torp (1994) and Bartsch et al (2009). and Torp (1994)

Distribution
Norway, Sweden and Denmark south to Portugal and Italy. Ireland east through Central Europe to Switzerland.

Biology
Found along riverside and alluvial forest of Populus and Salix and in mature fen
carr of Salix and Betula. Flowers visited include Euphorbia, Narthecium, Salix, Sorbus aucuparia and Stellaria. Adults fly April to May and July to August.

References

Diptera of Europe
Syrphini
Insects described in 1857
Taxa named by Camillo Rondani